Dan Euser is a Canadian artist, sculptor, designer, and landscape architect specializing in water features.  His works include various dynamic water sculptures for landmark architectural installations.

Most famous works of art
Euser's most well known works of art include the centerpiece for Toronto's Yonge-Dundas Square, as well as North America's largest human-made waterfall, installed as part of the National September 11 Memorial at the former site of the World Trade Center in New York City.  A portion of the waterfall for the World Trade Center Memorial, "Reflecting Absence," was prototyped at Euser's studio in 2005, for testing and design purposes.

Awards
Landscape architect Dan Euser honored as the water feature architect for the award winning Milwaukee Art Museum addition in 2001.
Dan Euser receives OALA Pinacle Award for outstanding professional achievement in 2006.

External links
NYT - A Backyard Fountain Like None Before (by David Dunlap)
DEW Inc (Dan Euser Waterarchitecture Inc) Web site

Living people
Canadian landscape architects
Year of birth missing (living people)